The Women's team foil event of the 2017 World Fencing Championships was held on 24 July 2017.

Results

Championship bracket

5–8th place bracket

9–16th place bracket

13–16th place bracket

Final ranking

References
Bracket

2017 World Fencing Championships